The Jewish Cemetery in Wschodnia street, Białystok (Podlaskie Voivodeship, Poland) was created in 1891, after the closure of the old cemetery,  the Rabbinic Cemetery, on Kalinowski Street. The Jewish cemetery is a listed heritage monument.

This is the only surviving Jewish cemetery in Białystok and one of the largest Jewish cemeteries in Northeastern Poland. The brick boundary wall encloses an area of 12.5 hectares, which contains around 6,000 Matzevah – the oldest of which dates to the year 1891. The matzevoth are made of marble, granite, limestone, and sandstone. There are inscriptions in Hebrew, Yiddish, Polish, Russian, and German.

The foundations of two buildings are found on the cemetery grounds just inside the main entrance: the Tahara house and the house of the warden and gravedigger. The last burial took place in 1969. On 17 July 1973, the cemetery was closed.

There is a monument in the cemetery commemorating around 90 Jews who died in a pogrom undertaken by the Russians in 1906, which was unveiled before the Second World War. The names of the victims in this pogrom are carved on black stone. This monument also records the names of victims of two massacres in 1905.

Restoration History 
In 1993–95, Samuel Gruber and Phyllis Myers published A Report to the United States Commission for the Preservation of America’s Heritage Abroad.  Jewish cemeteries were surveyed in respect to size, number of tombstones, and challenges to preservation. A decade earlier, mapping, and initial documentation near the main entrance by Bialystok’s conservator’s office was undertaken. The topographic map that was prepared also highlighted landmarks on this cemetery. Photographing of sections 1–5 was ostensibly completed. In 1991, the earliest cleanup effort on Bagnowka Jewish Cemetery with volunteers from the Netherlands was organized by Bialystok photographer and volunteer, Miroslaw Szut. From the late 1990s to c. 2012, local historian Tomasz Wisniewski, Ph.D. engaged in substantial documentation of Bagnowka Cemetery, assisted in translation by Heidi M. Szpek, Ph.D. and later Sara Mages. These efforts can be found at www.bagnowka.pl https:/

With the establishment of Centrum Edukacji Obywatelskiej Polska-Izrael in Bialystok (www.bialystok.jewish.org.pl ), care for Bagnowka Jewish Cemetery took on new directions under its president, Lucy Lisowska. A large gap in the cemetery’s western wall was repaired. An extensive wall adjoining the Catholic Cemetery was rebuilt, and the wall on Wschodnia Street was repaired and repainted. These projects were funded by Bialystok Holocaust Survivor, the late Samuel Solasz, and the City of Bialystok. Since the early 2000s, cleanup efforts were initiated and maintained through Centrum, often with the assistance of local school children. Restoration efforts also ensued with the volunteer efforts of international students from the United States, Israel, and Europe, coordinated by Centrum’s Lisowska with onsite materials and strategies for restoration by Bialystok volunteer, the late Waldemar Mierzejewski. From 2010 to 2018 Aktion Suhnezeichen Friedensdienste (ASF) held eight Summercamps devoted to restoration, coordinated by Lisowska and Mierzejewski. In 2010, Heidi M. Szpek, Ph.D. began collaborating with Centrum and in 2013 with ASF in their efforts on Bagnowka.

In 2012 and 2013, Centrum and ASF worked to restore Sections 3 and 5, just inside the main entrance, at right. Mierzejewski further developed and constructed a pulley-chain tripod device to assist in lifting stones. A simpler version had been constructed by ASF team leader Dr. Andreas Kahrs in 2010. In 2013, ASF and Centrum, in consultation with Szpek, prepared a tour of Bagnowka. In 2014, Szpek guided ASF and Centrum in major restoration efforts on the Memorial Complex. In 2015, efforts turned to Sections 1, 2 and 7, just inside the main entrance, at left, with some additional work in the Memorial Complex. In total, these restoration efforts cleaned several hundred stones whose vital details were added to the Bagnowka database, less than 100 were reset owing to weight and equipment limitations.

Since 2016, restoration on the cemetery took on a new direction, drawing on the vision and expertise of stone contractor Josh Degen and his wife, Amy Halpern Degen, of Massachusetts (USA). On a roots and educational tour in 2015, Amy, with ancestral roots in Bialystok and nearby Sokolka, unexpectedly came upon ASF working on the cemetery. As a stone contractor by trade, Josh Degen immediately recognized the potential of utilizing mechanized equipment on the cemetery to facilitate a more speedy and effective restoration. The Degens along with Massachusetts friends, Howie and Paula Flagler, founded the US NGO 501(c)(3) Bialystok Cemetery Restoration Fund (BCRF) in 2016. Gathering a group of volunteers from the United States, Germany, and Israel, along with local Poles, 301 tombstones were restored in 2016, 349 in 2017, and 310 in 2018 during one-week Summercamps. The organizational website is   

Szpek and her husband/photographer, Frank Idzikowski, joined BCRF volunteers. In 2018, Dr. Szpek joined the BCRF Board. In 2019, over 400 stones were restored in a 10-day Summercamp. Bialystok’s Waldemar Mierzejewski served as local liaison for the BCRF until his passing in 2018. The position of Bialystok liaison was then taken up by another longtime volunteer, Dr. Andrzej Końdej. The COVID-19 Pandemic in 2020 temporarily halted restoration work but local volunteers organized by Dr. Andrzej Ruszewicz, Przez, Społeczne Muzeum Żydów Białegostoku (www.jewishbialystok.pl ), coordinated a cleanup effort in 2021. In 2022, Dr. Rusewicz joined the Board of the BCRF. The uncertainty of the post-COVID-19 Pandemic world and the onset of the War in Ukraine necessitated postponement of a formal Summercamp until 2023. However, the Summer of 2022 held the first formal workshop on the cemetery by BCRP Board Members and volunteers. Nearly 20 local volunteers learned best practices in cemetery restoration, restoring nearly 65 matzevoth by hand. BCRF Board Members also met with key individuals and organizations related to the restoration work and projects.

In August 2022, 123 boulder-style and one megalithic granite stele were also extracted from a mound, located on Boya-Zelenskiego Street, on the unused land that belongs to Bagnowka Cemetery. They date from 1809–1852, suggesting their provenance is the Rabbinic Cemetery (c. 1781–1900) now buried beneath Central Park in Bialystok. Prior to 1831, no other cemetery existed for Bialystok’s Jewish community. This mound of matzevoth with human remains has long been known, dumped in this area in the 1960s amidst construction of the Communist Party Headquarters in Bialystok. Temporarily stored within Bagnowka Cemetery, the goal is to create a memorial with these matzevoth on an area that adjoins Central Park in Bialystok and was once part of the Rabbinic Cemetery. The human remains were reinterned on Bagnowka Cemetery and now await a memorial stone in remembrance.

More information and publications on the history and, especially, the inscriptions on this cemetery,can be found at Jewishepitaphs.org

Notable burials 
 Chaim Herz Halpern (d. 1919), Rabbi

External links 

 Description of the cemetery on Virtual Shtetl
 Restoration efforts related to Bagnowka-Bialystok Jewish Cemetery by the Bialystok Cemetery Restoration Project 
 
 Research related to Bagnowka-Bialystok Jewish Cemetery by Dr. Heidi M. Szpek 

Bialystok
Jews and Judaism in Białystok
Buildings and structures in Białystok
Objects of cultural heritage in Poland
Bialystok
1890s architecture